Carlos Mariani (born July 13, 1957) is a Minnesota politician and member of the Minnesota House of Representatives. A member of the Minnesota Democratic–Farmer–Labor Party (DFL), he represents District 65B, which includes portions of the city of Saint Paul in Ramsey County, which is part of the Twin Cities metropolitan area.

Education
Mariani graduated from Macalester College in Saint Paul with a B.A., and later attended the Humphrey Institute at the University of Minnesota, where he was a Mondale Policy Fellow, and the University of Minnesota Law School.

Minnesota House of Representatives
Mariani was first elected to the House in 1990 and has been reelected every two years since. He was chair of the K-12 Education Policy and Oversight Committee from 2007 to 2010 and an assistant majority leader during the 1995–1996 biennium.

Personal life
Mariani works in nonprofit management as the executive director of the Minnesota Education Equity Partnership.

References

External links 

 Rep. Mariani Web Page
 Minnesota Public Radio Votetracker: Rep. Carlos Mariani
 Project Votesmart - Rep. Carlos Mariani Profile

1957 births
Living people
People from Ramsey County, Minnesota
Politicians from Saint Paul, Minnesota
Democratic Party members of the Minnesota House of Representatives
Hispanic and Latino American state legislators
Macalester College alumni
Humphrey School of Public Affairs alumni
University of Minnesota Law School alumni
21st-century American politicians